HD 77258 is a binary star system in the southern constellation of Vela. It has the Bayer designation w Velorum, while HD 77258 is the identifier from the Henry Draper Catalogue. The system is visible to the naked eye as a faint point of light with a combined apparent visual magnitude of 4.45. It is located at a distance of approximately 218 light years from the Sun based on parallax. The radial velocity of the system barycenter is poorly constrained, but it appears to be drifting away at a rate of ~7 km/s.

The radial velocity variation of this system was first reported by H. K. Palmer in 1904. It is a single-lined spectroscopic binary with an orbital period of 74.14 days and an eccentricity (ovalness) of 0.00085, indicating the orbit is essentially circular. The visible component has a stellar classification of G8-K1III, matching a late G-type giant star. This is an evolved star that has exhausted the supply of hydrogen at its core, then cooled and expanded away from the main sequence. In 1975, S. Maladora flagged the spectrum as peculiar.

The level of ultraviolet flux coming from this system suggests the companion is a hot A-type star of class A6.5 or A7. The system is a source of X-ray emission.

References

K-type giants
Spectroscopic binaries
Vela (constellation)
Velorum, w
Durchmusterung objects
077258
044191
3591